The Amalgamated Society of Dyers, Finishers and Kindred Trades was a trade union representing dyers and workers in related jobs in the United Kingdom.

History

The union was founded in 1878 as the Bradford and District Amalgamated Society of Dyers, Crabbers, Singers and Finishers.  Initially extremely small, with only 77 members at the end of the 1870s, it won a strike in 1880, and it thereafter recruited rapidly, membership reaching 700 by 1884 and 1,801 in 1891.

From 1890 to 1891, the union led a strike at Manningham Mills.  This lasted six months and became nationally prominent.  Although it ended in defeat, almost all local dyers joining the union, which by 1894 was over 4,000.  In 1892, it was renamed as the Amalgamated Society of Dyers, adding "Bleachers and Kindred Trades" in about 1900.  It began recruiting nationally, and from 1909 also admitted women, taking membership over 10,000 by 1910.

Several local unions merged into the Amalgamated Society: the Glasgow Calendermens Protective and Funeral Association in 1912, the Nottingham Dyers Association in 1922, the Amalgamated Society of Stuff and Woollen Warehousemen in 1926 and the Radcliffe and District Dyers, Bleachers and Sizers Association in 1927.  In the 1920s, it added "Finishers" to its name before, in 1936, merging with the National Union of Textile Workers and the Operative Bleachers, Dyers and Finishers Association to form the National Union of Dyers, Bleachers and Textile Workers.

Election results
The union sponsored Willie Brooke as a Labour Party candidate at each general election from 1929 to 1935, twice winning a seat.

General Secretaries
1885: William Otty
1888: Henry Robinson
1893: Joseph Hayhurst
1919: William Rushworth
1929: Edward Verity
1933: George Bagnall

References

Defunct trade unions of the United Kingdom
Trade unions established in 1878
Trade unions disestablished in 1936
1878 establishments in the United Kingdom
Textile and clothing trade unions
Trade unions based in West Yorkshire